Bonita Melody Lysette "Bonnie" Langford (born 22 July 1964) is an English actress, dancer and singer. She came to prominence as a child star in the 1970s, when she had a notable role in the TV series Just William. 

In the 1980s, she played companion Mel Bush in Doctor Who. She has also been known for appearing in various musicals in the West End and on Broadway, including shows such as Peter Pan, Cats, The Pirates of Penzance and Chicago. From 2015 to 2018, she portrayed the role of Carmel Kazemi on the BBC soap opera EastEnders, for which she received the 2016 British Soap Award for Best Newcomer.

Early career 
Bonnie Langford attended the Arts Educational School, St Catherine's School, Twickenham and the Italia Conti Academy stage school. She first came to public attention when, aged six years old, she won the talent show Opportunity Knocks. This led to the role of Scarlett O'Hara's daughter in the London production of Scarlett (1972), and work in the 1974 Broadway revival of Gypsy starring Angela Lansbury, in the 1976 film Bugsy Malone, the 1977 film Wombling Free, and to still greater fame playing Violet Elizabeth Bott in the 1977-78 television series Just William. During this time, she was appearing as a regular on a children's prime-time show made by Yorkshire Television called Junior Showtime, along with child stars Lena Zavaroni, Neil Reid, Perry Cree, and Glynn Poole among others.

Career

Doctor Who

Between 1986 and 1987, Langford played the role of Mel, companion to both the Sixth and Seventh Doctors in the classic science fiction series Doctor Who. She returned to the role in 1993 for Dimensions in Time, a special charity Doctor Who/EastEnders crossover episode as part of the BBC's Children in Need. She has continued to reprise the role in several audio dramas alongside the Colin Baker and Sylvester McCoy Doctors and in a cameo in the episode "The Power of the Doctor".

Dancing

Langford was a featured dancer in BBC One's popular light entertainment series The Hot Shoe Show which she co-presented with Wayne Sleep. On 23 October 2005, she performed in Children Will Listen, a 75th birthday tribute to Stephen Sondheim at the Theatre Royal, Drury Lane. She is also a panto regular; recent credits include Peter in Peter Pan at the Richmond Theatre in Surrey (2008–2009); and Fairy Snow in Cinderella at the Yvonne Arnaud Theatre in Guildford (2013–2014).

Dancing on Ice

In 2006, Langford was a celebrity contestant in the first series of ITV's Dancing on Ice, partnering professional figure skater Matt Evers. Their routines were characterised by the dramatic lifts and tricks they performed and were amongst the most ambitious in the competitions. Viewers saw her bang her head as she was spun on the ice during rehearsals, illustrating the danger of some of the moves they were attempting. Their appearances were also notable for the differing reception they received from the panel of judges (which consistently voted them highly, awarding them the highest total scores and the only two maximum scores from individual judges) and the voting public (who twice placed them in the bottom two pairs, forcing a "skate off" to remain in the competition). They finished in third place overall.

Langford and Evers appeared again on the programme in the one-off Champion of Champions show which followed series two. They were scored second overall by the judging panel but again the public vote was less favourable and they were amongst the four teams eliminated in the first round of the competition. Langford then toured with Torvill and Dean's Dancing on Ice: The Tour in 2007.

Langford took part in the Dancing on Ice: The Tour in April and May 2008.

In 2014, Bonnie returned to Dancing on Ice for the ninth and final series (10 Week run), which saw the favourite celebrities from previous series. This time she was partnered with professional ice skater Andrei Lipanov. She was eliminated in Week 5 after losing out to Sam Attwater and his fiancé Vicky Ogden. In February 2014 she was announced as one of eight celebrities that would be appearing in Torvill & Deans Dancing on Ice: The Final Tour between March & April 2014.

Since Dancing on Ice

Langford's appearance on Dancing on Ice sparked a regeneration in her career. She returned to the West End theatre in 2006 playing the role of Roxie Hart in Chicago.

In 2006 and 2007, Langford appeared in the Birmingham and Plymouth tours of Guys and Dolls playing Miss Adelaide Adams, a dance hall hostess.

In July 2007, Langford was a judge on the ITV series Baby Ballroom: The Championship.

In 2009 and 2010, she again appeared in Chicago as Roxie Hart.

Langford played the role of Roz in the first UK tour production of the Broadway musical, 9 to 5, which was launched at the Opera House, Manchester on 12 October 2012.

In 2018 she took over the leading role of Dorothy Brock in the West End revival of 42nd Street, until the show closed on 5 January 2019; a recording from the end of the 2018 run aired as part of PBS's Great Performances’ third annual “Broadway’s Best” lineup in November 2019.

In 2021, Langford appeared on The Masked Dancer, masked as Squirrel. She reached the final and was announced as the runner up on 5 June.

EastEnders
On 5 April 2015, it was announced that Langford had joined long-running BBC soap opera EastEnders for a guest role, later promoted to a regular role as character Carmel Kazemi, the mother of established character, Kush Kazemi (Davood Ghadami). Carmel is described as an "overly protective" and "outspoken" mother. Commenting on the casting, Langford said: "I’m so thrilled and delighted to be part of EastEnders. I’m a great fan of the show and think the recent 30th Anniversary was sensational and shows just how good British television can be. To be part of this family is an absolute privilege."

Personal life
Langford is the aunt of actresses Summer, Scarlett, Zizi, and Saskia Strallen.

Filmography

Film

Television

Webcasts

Theatre and tour appearances

Pantomime appearances

Discography

Albums
 CATS (Original London Cast Recording) (2002)
 Gypsy: A Musical Fable (original cast recording)
 Wuthering Heights (original cast recording of Bernard J. Taylor's musical)
 Oliver!
 Seven Brides for Seven Brothers
 The Hot Shoe Show (TV soundtrack) (1983)
 Just One Kiss / 'Til He Phones 7" (1984)
 Let's Face The Music And Dance / I Feel Good (I Got You) / Take Me To The River - Nowhere To Run (medley) / Piano In The Dark (CD single) (1996)
 Bonnie Langford Now (Selections From Her One Woman Show Live and Direct) (1999)
 Jazz at the Theatre (2003)
 Leading Ladies (2009)

Audio

Awards and nominations

References

External links

 
 
 
 
 
 

1964 births
Living people
Alumni of the Italia Conti Academy of Theatre Arts
English child actresses
English female dancers
English film actresses
English musical theatre actresses
English soap opera actresses
English stage actresses
English television actresses
People educated at the Arts Educational Schools
Actors from Guildford
20th-century English actresses
21st-century English actresses